Inquisitor chocolatus is a species of sea snail, a marine gastropod mollusk in the family Pseudomelatomidae, the turrids and allies.

Description
The length of the shell attains 25 mm, its diameter 7 mm.

The fusiform, shining shell contains 12 whorls of which 2-3 are in the protoconch. These are smooth and convex. The subsequent whorls are concave at the top, then slightly convex. The sculpture consists of a few rounded ribs and a few inconspicuous, spiral striae. These number 9 in the body whorl, becoming obsolete at the periphery. The aperture measures 2/5 of the total length. The outer lip is thin and extends in the middle. The sinus is rather deep. The siphonal canal is oblique and recurved.

The dark chocolate-colour, with the three yellowish spots which are slightly nodulous on each rib, and the smooth concavity at the upper part of the whorls are very distinctive characters.

Distribution
This marine species occurs off Japan and the Philippines.

References

External links
 Smith, E. A. (1875). A list of the Gasteropoda collected in Japanese seas by Commander H. C. St. John, R. N. Annals and Magazine of Natural History. ser. 4, 15: 414-427
 Gastropods.com: Inquisitor chocolata
 

chocolatus
Gastropods described in 1875